Sir Roger Newdigate, 5th Baronet (30 May 1719 – 23 November 1806) was an English politician who sat in the House of Commons between  1742 and 1780. He was a collector of antiquities.

Early life
Newdigate was born in Arbury, Warwickshire, the son of Sir Richard Newdigate, 3rd Baronet (who died in 1727) and inherited the title 5th Baronet and the estates of Arbury and of Harefield in Middlesex on the early death of his brother in 1734.  He was educated at Westminster School and University College, Oxford, where he matriculated in 1736, and graduated M.A. in 1738; he contributed greatly to the university throughout the remainder of his life. He is best remembered as the founder of the Newdigate Prize on his death and as a collector of antiques, a number of which he donated to the university.  The prize for poetry helped make the names of many illustrious writers.

Political career
From 1742 until 1747, he served as Member of Parliament (MP) for Middlesex, and in 1751, he began a 30-year tenure as an MP for Oxford University.

He lavished attention on the Elizabethan Arbury Hall which he rebuilt over a period of thirty years in splendid Gothic Renaissance style, engaging the services of the architect Henry Couchman.

Private life
He married, firstly Sophia Conyers in 1743, and secondly Hesther Margaret Munday in 1776. Both marriages were childless and on his death in 1806 the baronetcy became extinct. Arbury Hall and Harefield passed to Francis Parker (1774–1862) of Kirk Hallam, Derbyshire, a distant cousin of the 5th Baronet, who then adopted the additional name of Newdigate. Francis Parker moved into Arbury Hall and married Lady Barbara Maria Legge, daughter of George Legge, 3rd Earl of Dartmouth, in 1820.

Legacy
Sir Roger was immortalised in fiction in George Eliot's Scenes of Clerical Life, where he appears as Sir Christopher Cheverel in Mr Gilfil's Love Story.

References

1719 births
1806 deaths
British MPs 1741–1747
British MPs 1747–1754
British MPs 1754–1761
British MPs 1761–1768
British MPs 1768–1774
British MPs 1774–1780
Newdigate, Roger, 5th Baronet
Members of the Parliament of Great Britain for English constituencies
Alumni of University College, Oxford
People educated at Westminster School, London
Members of the Parliament of Great Britain for Oxford University